Kema or KEMA may refer to:
KEMA, an energy consultancy company
Kema (river), a river in Russia
Kema District, a district in North Sulawesi, Indonesia
Kema Chikwe, Nigerian politician
Kema Jack (born 1982), footballer from Papua New Guinea

See also 
 Kemah (disambiguation)
 Keema
 Kima